The 1st National Congress of the Communist Party of China was held in Shanghai and Jiaxing between July 23 and August 2, 1921. The Congress established the Chinese Communist Party. It was succeeded by the 2nd National Congress of the Communist Party of China. The congress began in a shikumen building of the French Concession area of Shanghai (near present-day Xintiandi in Huangpu District). In early June 1921, Dutch national Henk Sneevliet, also known as Ma Lin, a representative of Comintern, arrived in Shanghai, and urged various Communist cells in the country to get together for a national-level meeting. Russian Comintern representative  also attended the meeting. At the time, there were 57 members of the Communist Party of China. Notably, the two founders of the party did not attend the congress: Chen Duxiu and Li Dazhao.

The meeting was put to an end due to harassment from the French Concession police on July 30. The delegates then agreed to move the meeting to a rented tourist boat on South Lake in Jiaxing. The Congress elected Chen Duxiu as Secretary (in absentia), Zhang Guotao as Director of Organization, and Li Da as Director of Propaganda.

The General Assembly adopted The First Program of the Communist Party of China, stating that "the Party is to be named the Communist Party of China" and specifying its objectives: "to overthrow the power of the capitalist class[,]" to "eradicate capitalism and private ownership of property[,]" and to "join the Comintern."

Of the 13 representatives who attended the congress in 1921, only two would be present at the proclamation ceremony of the People's Republic of China 28 years later: Mao Zedong and Dong Biwu. Others either became casualties of war in the decades that followed or left the party in one way or another (e.g. by expulsion or defection).

The site of the conference in Shanghai has been converted into a museum since 1961. The South Lake Revolutionary Museum in Jiaxing located on a central island of the lake was constructed in 1959; a complex hosting more exhibits was constructed north of South Lake in 2011, also to commemorate the 1st Congress.  The Congress would be followed by the 2nd Central Executive Committee of the Communist Party of China.

Representatives 

 Li Da (Shanghai)
 Li Hanjun (Shanghai)
 Zhang Guotao (Beijing)
  (Beijing)
 Mao Zedong (Changsha)
 He Shuheng (Changsha)
 Dong Biwu (Wuhan)
 Chen Tanqiu (Wuhan)
  (Jinan)
  (Jinan)
 Chen Gongbo (Guangzhou)
 Zhou Fohai (representing Chinese students in Japan)
  (representing the absent Chen Duxiu)

References

National Congress of the Chinese Communist Party
1921 in China
1920s in Shanghai
1921 conferences
Jiaxing
History of Zhejiang